According to the Ontario Hospital Association (OHA) website, the OHA is a member association that represents approximately 154 public hospitals in Ontario. The association regards itself as "the voice of Ontario's public hospitals".

History

On December 13, 1923 – at the request of Dr. Fred W. Routley, the Ontario Director of the Canadian Red Cross at the time, a group of hospital workers met at the Toronto Academy of Medicine to lay the foundation for the establishment of the OHA. The 58 attendees consisted of hospital physicians, nurses, superintendents, business managers, trustees and association executives.

It was at this meeting that the OHA, as it is known today, was launched. The attendees also agreed that the first OHA convention would be held the following fall.
October 2 and 3, 1924, marked the OHA's first convention and annual general meeting attended by 106 registered participants. At this event, there was a lot of discussion on a range of topics from the high costs of hospitalization, to financial problems and a new blood transfusion method. (Source: "80 Years of Progress", the Ontario Hospital Association)

Historical context
Canadian historian David Gagan, in a section of the book "Health and Canadian society: sociological perspectives", discusses the rise of the modern hospital in Ontario from 1880 to 1950, from which the following information is derived.

Until the end of the 19th century, Canadian hospitals mainly cared for the indigent, with middle-class patients favouring medical care at home to care in the hospital. New technology – laboratories,  x-ray machines, hospital child birth, and antiseptic surgery – radically transformed hospitals in a short period of time up to the end of the First World War in 1918 and made them more acceptable to middle-class patients. However, these technologies were expensive and the allowance paid to hospitals by government to cover the costs of caring for indigent patients did not meet the actual costs. Since hospitals were still mandated to care for indigents, middle-class patients were charged more and more to subsidize care for the poor. This eventually strained patients' capacity to pay.

At that time, hospitals' total income from all sources of revenue – including paying patients, municipal and government subsidization, donor contributions – were only enough to maintain a static system, not an enterprise that was now improving during a time of medical progress.

In 1927, these emerging challenges led the President of the OHA to note that it was neither useful nor realistic to continue in this manner, and the idea of the hospital as a purely charitable endeavor was rendered obsolete. He proposed instead, that the goal of the modern hospital was to provide the best diagnostic and therapeutic facilities available for a fee to patients who paid the full cost of their care. The government's insufficient subsidy for indigent patients transferred the fiscal burden to paying patients ("people of moderate means") and diverted any additional hospital income to cover the costs of non-paying patients.

This was seen as a barrier to medical progress. According to Gagan, the objective was not to deny indigent patients access to hospital care, but to appeal to middle-class self-interest in order to spur statutory changes in government social policy that would explicitly recognize that hospitals were no longer charitable enterprises. Rather, hospitals had become centres for the scientific treatment of diseases among all classes for a fair price in relation to the value of the product and the ability of the consumer to pay for non-profit treatment.  The OHA and hospitals wanted a shift from the traditional charitable role of hospitals, to one that was "committed to scientific professionalism and recognized the realities of hospital economics".

In a 1936 study (Ontario Survey of General Hospitals, 1940) undertaken by the Ontario Department of Health during the Depression, it was noted that lengths-of-stay (LOS) for the poor and indigent patients increased, while LOS decreased for paying patients. The report, which was finalized in 1940, concluded that the trend of hospitals returning to their former role as custodial care facilities and municipalities' mounting expenditures on medical care, was a temporary condition.  Among the recommendations was to police the hospitals to eliminate waste, inefficiency and long-stay indigent patients.

This government rationale was among the factors that drew interest among federal and provincial constituencies which included the OHA, to support the idea of health insurance. In 1943, Prime Minister WLM King created an Advisory Committee on Health Insurance to consult broadly on the issue, which consequently produced the Heagarty Committee Report. In the meantime, private carriers and not-for-profit organizations such as Blue Cross, which was organized by the Canadian Hospital Association, had begun to provide voluntary group hospitalization insurance coverage through employers. "The hard times of the 1930s created the momentum behind the establishment of Blue Cross® in Ontario."  By 1956, 50% of Canadians were covered by voluntary private or nonprofit prepayment plans, but public pressure for a nationwide program to protect people from catastrophic health-care costs was growing.

On a provincial level, as early as the 1940s, the OHA began to step up its lobbying efforts to government on behalf of Ontario hospitals, primarily for funds (which was a prime function of the OHA since its inception), because of new challenges such as the spiraling costs of health care, which did not match government funding.  One of the proposed solutions at the time was universal hospital insurance, which the OHA generally supported.

Years later, in 1957, Ontario Premier Leslie M. Frost tabled the Ontario memorandum and proposal on hospital care insurance before the Ontario Legislature.  During his speech, he publicly acknowledged a body of experts who helped conduct studies related to this proposal, which included the executive of the Ontario Hospital Association and the Blue Cross.  He added that as part of the conditions of implementation, the plan was to be "administered by the Ontario Hospital Service Commission, either through the agency of the Blue Cross or by a crown corporation similar to the Blue Cross, and by personnel drawn from the Ontario Hospital Association."

"In 1959, the Government of Ontario launched the Ontario Hospital Insurance Plan. 600 Blue Cross employees as well as most of its top management team moved over to help guide in the plan's development."

On a national level, Medicare developed in two stages. The first was the Hospital Insurance and Diagnostic Act of 1957, which gave the Canadian government authority to enter into an agreement with the provinces to establish a comprehensive, universal plan covering acute hospital care and laboratory and radiology diagnostic services. Nine years later, the Medical Care Act of 1966 extended health insurance to cover doctors' services. This led to a federal government offer to share, on a grant-in-aid basis, the costs of a Canada-wide plan, on condition that the majority of provinces take part and a majority of the population be covered. By mid-1957, eight provinces indicated that they would join in such a proposal. By 1961 all provinces had hospital plans in operation and 99% of the population was covered. This included coverage for all standard-ward hospital care."

Executives
Anthony Dale is the current president and chief executive officer, appointed to the position in December 2013. Marcia Visser is the 2012–2013 chair of the board.

Additional resources
 The Hospitals of Ontario: A Short History by the Hospitals Division of the Department of Health (1934)
 Canadian Healthcare and the State: A Century of Evolution by David Naylor (1992)
 Health and Canadian Society: Sociological Perspectives, Third edition by D. Coburn, C. D'Arcy, and G. M. Torrance (1998)
 Private Practice. Public Payment: Canadian Medicine and the Politics of Health Insurance 1911-1966 by David Naylor (1986)

References

External links
 Official website

Medical and health organizations based in Ontario